Pleasant Township is one of eighteen townships in Appanoose County, Iowa, United States. As of the 2010 census, its population was 793.

Geography
According to the USGS, it contains nine cemeteries: Adamson, Baker, Boswell, Evergreen, Morrison, Motto, Pleasant Hill, Porter and White.

References

External links
 US-Counties.com
 City-Data.com

Townships in Appanoose County, Iowa
Townships in Iowa